The  is a building in Higashiyamato, Tokyo. Damaged in US air raids during World War II, it is maintained as a war memorial.

History
The building served as a transformer substation for the Hitachi Aircraft Company factory located in Tachikawa. Built in 1938, it was attacked repeatedly during the latter part of World War II. 
On February 17 it was attacked by US Navy F6F Hellcat fighters and other aircraft, and on April 19 by US Army Air Force P-51 Mustang aircraft. On April 29 B-29 bombing raids destroyed local factories and slightly damaged the substation.

After the war it operated until 1993. On October 1, 1995 it was designated as a cultural asset and is now located in a public park.

Visits
The substation is open every Wednesday and Sunday between 10:30am-4pm. No registrations are necessary.

References

World War II memorials in Japan
Electrical substations
Buildings and structures in Tokyo
Electric power infrastructure in Japan
Energy infrastructure completed in 1938
1938 establishments in Japan
Higashiyamato, Tokyo